Sikar Lok Sabha constituency is one of the 25 Lok Sabha (parliamentary) constituencies in Rajasthan state in India.

Assembly segments
Presently, Sikar Lok Sabha constituency comprises eight Vidhan Sabha (legislative assembly) segments. These are:

Members of Parliament
1952: Nand Lal Sharma, Ram Rajya Parishad
1957: Rameshwar Tantia, Indian National Congress
1962: Rameshwar Tantia, Indian National Congress
1967: Gopal Saboo, Jan Sangh
1971: Shrikrishan Modi, Indian National Congress
1977: Jagdish Prasad Mathur, Janata Party
1980: Kumbharam Arya, Janata Party
1984: Balram Jakhar, Indian National Congress
1989: Devi Lal, Janata Party
1991: Balram Jakhar, Indian National Congress
1996: Dr. Hari Singh, Indian National Congress
1998: Subhash Maharia, Bharatiya Janata Party
1999: Subhash Maharia, Bharatiya Janata Party
2004; Subhash Maharia, Bharatiya Janata Party
2009: Mahadev Singh Khandela, Indian National Congress
2014: Swami Sumedhanand Saraswati, Bhartiya Janata Party
2019: Swami Sumedhanand Saraswati, Bhartiya Janata Party

Election results

2019

 BJP hold

2014

2009

2004

See also
 Sikar district
 List of Constituencies of the Lok Sabha

References

External links
Sikar lok sabha constituency election 2019 result details

Lok Sabha constituencies in Rajasthan
Sikar district